Ben Purrington (born 20 May 1996) is an English professional footballer who plays as a left back for Ross County.

Career

Plymouth Argyle
Purrington was born in Exeter, Devon. He joined the Plymouth Argyle youth academy in September 2005 when he was nine. He signed his first professional contract in May 2013. Seven months later, Purrington made his first-team debut in a League Two match against Oxford United, and scored his first senior goal in his fourth match; an FA Cup tie with Port Vale.

He soon became a regular in the side after an injury suffered to teammate Gary Sawyer at the beginning of the 2016–17 season. However, after 12 years of being at the club, Purrington played his final match for Argyle against Cheltenham Town on 21 January 2017.

Rotherham United
On 30 January 2017, Purrington completed a move to Championship side Rotherham United for a reported £300,000 fee, signing a three-and-a-half-year contract. He made his debut in a 1–0 away defeat to Bristol City on 4 February 2017.

Loans to AFC Wimbledon and Charlton Athletic
Purrington joined League One club AFC Wimbledon on 1 August 2018 on loan for the 2018–19 season. He scored his first goal for Wimbledon in an FA Cup tie against Halifax Town on 1 December 2018. He was recalled to Rotherham United on 10 January 2019.

On the same day as his recall, Purrington joined League One club Charlton Athletic on loan until the end of the season.

Charlton Athletic
On 2 July 2019, Purrington joined Charlton Athletic on a three-year contract.

On 13 June 2022, it was confirmed that Purrington would be leaving Charlton Athletic following the expiration of his contract.

Ross County
On 29 June 2022, Purrington signed a two-year deal at Ross County.

Personal life
Purrington's uncle is former England rugby union player Richard Hill.

Career statistics

Honours
Rotherham United
EFL League One play-offs: 2018

Charlton Athletic
EFL League One play-offs: 2019

References

External links

Profile at the AFC Wimbledon website

1996 births
Living people
Sportspeople from Exeter
Footballers from Devon
English footballers
Association football defenders
Plymouth Argyle F.C. players
Rotherham United F.C. players
AFC Wimbledon players
Charlton Athletic F.C. players
Ross County F.C. players
English Football League players
Scottish Professional Football League players